Giovanni Sada (born 10 September 1989), also known as Giò Sada or Gulliver, is an Italian singer-songwriter and actor. He is best known for winning the ninth season of the Italian talent show X Factor in 2015. His debut single, "Il rimpianto di te", was released on 4 December 2015.

Early life
Giovanni Sada was born in Bari, Apulia, in southern Italy, on 10 September 1989.
Encouraged by his father Silvio, a member of the band "Addosso gli scalini", and by his mother Paola, a dancer and musician, he began singing at the age of seven.

Shortly after starting to study Food and Wine Heritage at the Università degli studi di Bari Aldo Moro, he left university and focused on music, touring across Europe. He also worked as a porter and as a stage assembler, and he later joined an acting company.

Career
In 2007, Sada became the lead singer of his first band, No Blame, a punk rock band from Bari that released an EP, Keep the Hardcore Elite in 2008 and an album Burning the Blindfolds in 2010 and went on tour around Europe following the release of the record. His next experience is with the band Waiting for Better Days, performing hardcore punk and metal music.
The band released the album To Those Who Believe to Be Left Alone in April 2012, for Italian independent label .
In 2013, he also became the leader of the band Barismoothsquad, which released its first self-produced studio album in July 2014, Barismoothsquad. Together with his bands, Giosada also toured across Europe.

In 2015, Sada took part in the shooting of the independent film Dove chi entra urla, directed by Fabrizio Pastore, interpreting one of the main characters, Priso. The film is set to be released in Italian theatres in 2016. 
During the same year, he successfully auditioned for the ninth series of X Factor, singing Depeche Mode's "Personal Jesus". He competed in the "Over 25" category, mentored by Elio. During the fifth live show, he finished in the bottom two, but was saved by the judges, who voted to eliminate the band Landlord.
On 3 December 2015, during the semi-final of the show, Sada performed his first single, "Il rimpianto di te", co-written with Italian singer-songwriter Pacifico and Alberto Tafuri, and released the following day to digital stores and Italian radio stations.
On 10 December 2015, Sada was announced the winner, beating runner up duo Urban Strangers.
Sada's self-titled debut EP, including the single "Il rimpianto di te" and five studio recordings of covers previously performed during the show, was released on 11 December 2015.

Discography

Studio albums

EPs

Singles

Other charted songs

Music videos

Filmography

References

1989 births
21st-century Italian  male singers
Italian pop singers
Living people
The X Factor winners
X Factor (Italian TV series) contestants
People from Bari
Italian male actors
Italian male  singer-songwriters